Göran Nilsson may refer to:
 Göran Nilsson (ice hockey)
 Göran Nilsson (cinematographer)